Rajiv Gandhi Women And Children's Hospital (opened in 1690) is a hospital in Pondicherry, the capital of the Union territory of Puducherry, India. The building is over 300 years old. In 2017 a proposition was put forward to increase the amount of beds from 430 to 700.  In 2019 there were 1,104, members of staff (including 32 specialists, 291 nurses and 158 ward attenders).

References

Medical colleges in Puducherry
Hospitals in Puducherry
Buildings and structures in Pondicherry (city)